John Anslow (6 October 1935 – 6 April 2017) was a New Zealand field hockey player. He competed at the 1964 Summer Olympics and the 1968 Summer Olympics.

Anslow died on 6 April 2017.

References

External links
 

1935 births
2017 deaths
New Zealand male field hockey players
Olympic field hockey players of New Zealand
Field hockey players at the 1964 Summer Olympics
Field hockey players at the 1968 Summer Olympics